Wilfried Dalmat (born 17 July 1982) is a footballer who plays as a midfielder. Born in mainland France, he plays for the Saint Martin national team.

Club career

Early career in France
Dalmat started his career in the youth team of U.S. Chambray-lès-Tours. In 1996, he moved to FC Nantes, where he was promoted to the first team in 2000. He won the Ligue 1 title with Nantes in 2001, and the following season, he played as a substitute and scored, as Nantes won the 2001 Trophée des Champions. He made his first appearances in the UEFA Champions League on 11 September 2001, against PSV Eindhoven.

In January 2002, he moved to Olympique Marseille, with whom he came in ninth overall place. In the summer, he returned to Nantes, before leaving for LB Châteauroux of the Ligue 2 in the winter transfer window.

After a fifth place, he moved within the second-highest French tier to Grenoble, where he also remained the half season.

Stints in Italy and Spain
In the spring of 2004, he signed a contract with U.S. Lecce, for which he made 10 appearances in the Serie A. For the following season, he returned to Grenoble. Dalmat spent the 2005–06 season in Spain with Racing Santander, who escaped relegation by one point, finishing 17th.

Stints in Belgium
Dalmat then moved to Belgium to RAEC Mons, finishing 8th and 16th respectively, in his two seasons with the club. In 2008, he signed with Standard Liège, where he won his second league title, as well as his second Super Cup.

In the summer of 2010, he moved to Standard's rivals, Club Brugge.

Later years
On 10 December 2013, he signed a six-month contract with Greek club Panetolikos F.C. He was released on 9 April 2014.

He joined Solières Sport of the Belgian Second Amateur Division in January 2021. He left the club in October, citing "personal reasons".

International career
Born in France of Martiniquais descent, Dalmat made his debut with the Saint Martin national football team on 5 September 2019, in a 4–0 loss against Barbados in a match valid for the 2019–20 CONCACAF Nations League. Three days later, he also scored his first international goal in a 2–1 loss against U.S. Virgin Islands.

Personal life
Dalmat's brother, Stéphane, is a retired footballer. In the 2005–06 season, the two brothers played together for Racing de Santander.

Career statistics
Scores and results list Saint Martin's goal tally first.

Honours
Nantes
 Ligue 1: 2000–01
 Trophée des Champions: 2001

Standard Liège
 Belgian First Division A: 2008–09
 Belgian Super Cup: 2008, 2009

References

External links
 

1982 births
Living people
French people of Martiniquais descent
Sportspeople from Tours, France
Saint Martinois footballers
French footballers
Footballers from Centre-Val de Loire
Association football midfielders
Saint Martin international footballers
Serie A players
Belgian Pro League players
Challenger Pro League players
Süper Lig players
La Liga players
Super League Greece players
TFF First League players
Championnat National 3 players
FC Nantes players
Olympique de Marseille players
LB Châteauroux players
Grenoble Foot 38 players
U.S. Lecce players
Racing de Santander players
R.A.E.C. Mons players
Standard Liège players
Club Brugge KV players
Orduspor footballers
Karşıyaka S.K. footballers
Panetolikos F.C. players
RWS Bruxelles players
Bourges 18 players
Vierzon FC players
French expatriate footballers
Saint Martin expatriate footballers
French expatriate sportspeople in Italy
Expatriate footballers in Italy
French expatriate sportspeople in Belgium
Expatriate footballers in Belgium
French expatriate sportspeople in Spain
Expatriate footballers in Spain
French expatriate sportspeople in Turkey
Expatriate footballers in Turkey
Expatriate footballers in France